Stericta rurealis is a species of moth of the family Pyralidae. It is found in New Guinea.

References

Epipaschiinae
Moths described in 1912